Caerleon Bridge is a bridge crossing of the River Usk at Caerleon in the city of Newport, Wales, carrying the B4236 road from Caerleon-ultra-Pontem into Caerleon itself.

The stone built bridge was built by David Edwards between in 1806 and 1812 as a replacement for the previous wooden bridge. Prior to the opening of the A449 dual carriageway a few miles to the east in 1972, the narrow bridge and streets of Caerleon carried the trunk road from Newport to Raglan via Caerleon Bridge. A steel and concrete footbridge was attached in 1974.

The bridge is the furthest upstream of the twelve bridges over the River Usk within the city boundaries of Newport.

The foundation stone of the original Newport Bridge is set into the stonework of Caerleon Bridge bearing the inscription "This bridge was erected at the expense of the County by David Edwards and his two sons William and Thomas. Completed AD MDCCC."

References

See also
Newport and Caerleon Bridges over Usk Act 1597
List of bridges in Wales

Bridges in Newport, Wales
Bridges completed in 1806
Bridges over the River Usk
Landmarks in Newport, Wales
Grade II listed bridges in Wales
Former toll bridges in Wales
Road bridges in Wales
Caerleon
Stone bridges in the United Kingdom
Grade II listed buildings in Caerleon, Wales